Giovanni Soro (Venice, ? - 1544) was an Italian professional code-cracker. He was the Renaissance's first outstanding cryptanalyst and the Western world's first great cryptanalyst. Soro is known as the father of modern cryptography.

Career

Soro was employed in Venice in 1506 by the Council of Ten as cipher breaker-in-chief. They were the first secret service specializing in codebreaking. Soro ran the cryptanalysis operation in secret as the cipher secretary. Soro's tasks included deciphering secret messages captured from the messenger spies of Venice's rivals. At the time, Venice was plagued by espionage and subterfuge. The Council of Ten had its own ciphers changed often so as to impede competitors such as François Viète, a French mathematician (father of modern algebraic notation).

Successful diplomacy depended on knowing the adjacent principalities' thoughts and ideas. Soro was able to decipher the ciphers of most other courts. By 1510, he had forced most of them to develop their ciphers to a much higher degree of sophistication. As a result, the Papal Curia hired him to break codes their own cipher analysts in Rome could not. Pope Clement VII often sent messages to Soro for cryptanalysis to test their impenetrability.

Soro's work in Venice continued to take priority over his work at the Vatican. He was Venice's principal cryptanalyst for almost 40 years. His work is among the earliest successful cryptanalysis which has been preserved. Soro's reputation was great throughout the leaders of other Italian city-states and Europe. He was so successful that he was given two assistants and a secret office in the Doge's Palace above the Sala di Segret by 1542. He made Venice a Renaissance bastion of diplomatic cryptology.

Soro wrote a treatise in Italian, French, Spanish, and Latin in the early 16th century on cryptography and solving ciphers which has since been lost.

Notes

References
Kahn, David (1996). The Codebreakers: The Comprehensive History of Secret Communication from Ancient Times to the Internet. Scribner, .
Anzovin, Steven,  Famous First Facts: A Record of First Happenings, Discoveries, and Inventions in World History, H.W. Wilson (2000), 
Singh, Simon (1999). The Code Book: The Secret History of Codes and Code-Breaking. Fourth Estate, .
Lloyd, Mark, The Guinness Book of Espionage, Da Capo Press (1994), 
Mollin, Richard A., An Introduction to Cryptography, CRC Press (2000), 
 The New Encyclopædia Britannica, Encyclopædia Britannica (1983), 

Pre-19th-century cryptographers
1544 deaths
Year of birth unknown